Pulluvila is a village between  Kovalam and Poovar in Thiruvananthapuram district of Kerala state, India. The main occupation of this village is fishing. More than 80% of the people are belongs to Latin Catholic Mukkuva community. This village is also well known in beach football. Too many sports talented persons are rising from this village. And well known in relegious harmony. Christians, Muslims, Hindus all are leaving together in peace. Main attraction of pulluvila is the Christian church named as ST. JACOB FORANE CHURCH PULLUVILA.

Community Centers 
Beaches are the common and favourite community center for the locals in the village. Most of the villagers spend their evenings at the beaches which are also used for playing football every evening by the local children of the village. Other community centers are;

St. Jacob's Community Hall, Pulluvila 

Madonna Hall, Kochupally 

Tsunami Market, Valiyapally

Kochupally Market, Pulluvila 

SA Theatre, Pulluvila

Sports 
Pulluvila is a land of Sports stars like any other coastal villages in trivandrum. If Pozhiyoor known for footballers Pulluvila known for all kind of Sports and athletics. Indian Cricketer Sanju Samson, Olympian Alex Antony, Footballer Bijoy Varghese are some of the notable people from the village. Apart from them many footballers plays for different ISL,I-League,KPL teams. Not just boys, many girls are also part of state and national teams of rugby, football, etc,.. Like football many boys plays volleyball and participates to local tournaments. 

Many Sports and Arts clubs boost youngsters to achieve their goals at sports. Some of the active sports and arts clubs are;

- Jaihind Sports and Arts Club, Pulluvila 

- Friends Sports and Arts Club, Pulluvila 

- Kalasagar Sports and Arts Club, Pulluvila 

- St. Peter's Sports and Arts Club, Kochupally

- St. Jacob's Sports and Arts Club, Valiyapally

- Swaraj Sports and Arts Club, Pulluvila 

- Brothers Sports and Arts Club, Pulluvila

- Galaxy Sports and Arts Club, Pulluvila 

Pulluvila is also gifted with many beach football grounds. Leo XIII School ground is a common Sports area to practice any games. List of the mud grounds at Pulluvila;

- Leo XIII School Ground 

- St. Peter's Stadium 

- Jaihind Stadium 

- Friends Club 5's Ground 

- Swaraj Mud Ground 

- Kalasagar Ground

Libraries 
Jaihind Library is the oldest library in Pulluvila. A Sports and Arts club also works along with the library from the beginning. And many footballers has risen from the club and been part of the various santhosh trophy teams. Apart from that a Vanita library called Friends Vanitha Library and Kalasagar Library are also situated in the village. During the Covid-19 pandemic period, these libraries helped the local student in their studies through becoming community study centers.

Healthcare Centers 
Pulluvila PHC

Brother's Hospital, Pulluvila 

St. Joseph Hospital, Kochupally 

Swastika Homeopathic Medical Centre, Pulluvila

Religious Institutions 
St. Jacob's Forane Church, Pulluvila 

St. Peter's Catholic Church, Kochupally 

Keezhathil Mudippura Temple, Pulluvila 

Malankara Catholic Church, Pulluvila 

Jum-a-musjid, Pulluvila 

St. Francis Xavier's Church, Vellelunbu

Sree Mathru Devi Temple, Pulluvila

Deepa Sadan Convent,Pulluvila

Madona Bhavan,Kochupally 

St. Jude's Convent, Pulluvila

Educational Institutions 
Leo XIII HSS Pulluvila

St. Mary's LPS Pulluvila

Children's Palace, Kindergarten, Kochupally

St. Jude English Medium Nursery, Pulluvila 

New Balabhavan Nursery, Pulluvila

Govt. Muhammadan LPS Pulluvila

Notable People
 Sanju Samson, Indian Cricketer and Rajasthan Royals Captain
 Bijoy Varghese, Footballer, Plays for Kerala Blasters
 Alex Antony, Indian Olympian (Athlete)

Administration
Pulluvila is part of Neyyattinkara Taluk in Thiruvananthapuram district.  It comes under Karumkulam Panchayath.

Access

Post office
Pulluvila village has a post office and the postal code is 695526.

References

Villages in Thiruvananthapuram district